Thyene is a genus of jumping spiders that was first described by Eugène Louis Simon in 1885. It is a junior synonym of Mithion, and senior synonym of Brancus, Paramodunda and Gangus.

Species
 it contains fifty-one species and one subspecies, found in Africa, Europe, Asia, Brazil, and Queensland:
Thyene aperta (Peckham & Peckham, 1903) – Ivory Coast, Tanzania, Zimbabwe
Thyene australis Peckham & Peckham, 1903 – Congo, Southern Africa
Thyene benjamini Prószyński & Deeleman-Reinhold, 2010 – Indonesia (Sumbawa)
Thyene bilineata Lawrence, 1927 – Namibia, South Africa
Thyene bivittata Xie & Peng, 1995 – Pakistan, India, Nepal, China
Thyene blaisei (Simon, 1902) – West Africa
Thyene bucculenta (Gerstäcker, 1873) – East, South Africa
Thyene calebi (Kanesharatnam & Benjamin, 2018) – India, Sri Lanka
Thyene chopardi Berland & Millot, 1941 – Niger
Thyene coccineovittata (Simon, 1886) – West, South Africa, Kenya. Introduced to France, Brazil
Thyene concinna (Keyserling, 1881) – Australia (Queensland)
Thyene corcula (Pavesi, 1895) – Ethiopia
Thyene coronata Simon, 1902 – Southern Africa
Thyene dakarensis (Berland & Millot, 1941) – Senegal
Thyene dancala Caporiacco, 1947 – Ethiopia
Thyene decora (Simon, 1902) – Australia (Queensland)
Thyene gangoides Prószyński & Deeleman-Reinhold, 2010 – Bali
Thyene hemmingi (Caporiacco, 1949) – Kenya
Thyene hesperia (Simon, 1910) – Guinea, Ivory Coast, Nigeria
Thyene imperialis (Rossi, 1846) (type) – Southern Europe, North and East Africa, Middle East to Central Asia and China, Pakistan, India, Indonesia
Thyene inflata (Gerstäcker, 1873) – Africa, Madagascar
Thyene leighi Peckham & Peckham, 1903 – Kenya, Zimbabwe, South Africa
Thyene longula (Simon, 1902) – Australia (Queensland)
Thyene manipisa (Barrion & Litsinger, 1995) – Philippines
Thyene mutica (Simon, 1902) – Central, West, Southern Africa
Thyene natalii Peckham & Peckham, 1903 – Ethiopia, Kenya, Mozambique, Zimbabwe, South Africa
Thyene nigriceps (Caporiacco, 1949) – Kenya
Thyene ocellata (Thorell, 1899) – West Africa, Equatorial Guinea (Bioko)
Thyene ogdeni Peckham & Peckham, 1903 – South Africa
Thyene o. nyukiensis Lessert, 1925 – East Africa
Thyene orbicularis (Gerstäcker, 1873) – East Africa
Thyene orientalis Zabka, 1985 – China, Vietnam, Japan
Thyene ornata Wesolowska & Tomasiewicz, 2008 – Ethiopia
Thyene phragmitigrada Metzner, 1999 – Greece, Spain (Balearic Is.)
Thyene poecila (Caporiacco, 1949) – Kenya
Thyene punctiventer (Karsch, 1879) – West Africa
Thyene rubricoronata (Strand, 1911) – Indonesia (Kei Is.)
Thyene scalarinota Strand, 1907 – South Africa
Thyene semiargentea (Simon, 1884) – Sudan, Uganda, Tanzania, South Africa
Thyene sexplagiata (Simon, 1910) – São Tomé and Príncipe
Thyene similis Wesolowska & van Harten, 2002 – Yemen (Socotra)
Thyene splendida Caporiacco, 1939 – Ethiopia
Thyene striatipes (Caporiacco, 1939) – East Africa
Thyene subsplendens Caporiacco, 1947 – East Africa
Thyene tamatavi (Vinson, 1863) – Madagascar
Thyene thyenioides (Lessert, 1925) – Africa
Thyene triangula Xie & Peng, 1995 – China
Thyene typica Jastrzebski, 2006 – Nepal
Thyene varians Peckham & Peckham, 1901 – Madagascar
Thyene verdieri (Berland & Millot, 1941) – Guinea
Thyene villiersi Berland & Millot, 1941 – Ivory Coast
Thyene vittata Simon, 1902 – Ethiopia, South Africa
Thyene yuxiensis Xie & Peng, 1995 – China, Nepal

References

External links
 Photograph of T. phragmitigrada
 Photograph of T. imperialis

Salticidae genera
Salticidae
Spiders of Africa
Spiders of Asia
Spiders of Australia